Elini Dimoutsos (born 18 June 1988) is a Greek professional footballer who plays as a midfielder for Super League 2 club Egaleo.

Club career

Early life and career
After growing up in his native Albania, his family moved to Greece when he was seven. He started playing football in the youth team of Ilisiakos. In the 2006–07 season he was on loan to Fostiras (National D Division); scouts from Panathinaikos were impressed by him and he moved to Panathinaikos FC, signing for four years in July 2007.He is a midfielder and was selected for the Greece National Under 19 Football Team, with which he played a vital role in the EURO U19 Championships, where Greece finished second to Spain.

Panathinaikos
He endeared himself to the Panathinaikos fans with his impressive dribbling skills, stamina and determination to win the ball. Although being signed primarily as a reserve player, Dimoutsos broke into the first team due to his performance. He is a versatile player, who can operate at defensive midfield, right midfield and central midfield.

In the summer transfer period of 2008, Dimoutsos signed with Crete club OFI on loan.

In January 2010, Dimoutsos signed with Panetolikos on loan. In the summer of 2010, he returned to Panathinaikos and, after participating in the team's pre-season training, he gained a spot at the team's roster. While managing to participate against Barcelona in November 2010 in the group stage of the Champions League, he did not gain any more appearances with the main team and was loaned to FK Mladá Boleslav for the rest of the 2011 season.

Atromitos
In the summer transfer period of 2011, Dimoutsos wasn't in Jesualdo Fereira plans for the new season and he transferred in Atromitos signing 2 years contract. He made his debut on 30 September with the team in an away 1–0 victory against Aris. A year later during the 2012–13 season, he scored with the team in a tremendous 3–2 away victory against Olympiacos in Karaiskakis stadium. On 15 July 2015, after four years with the club and 151 appearances in all competitions, Atromitos announces the end of the cooperation with the player. Therefore, along with Luigi Cennamo, has informed that are not included in the planning of the club for the next season.

Asteras Tripolis
Reports from Tripoli suggest that the midfielder, who ended his contract with Atromitos, will probably sign with Asteras Tripolis for the next season. Eventually on 19 June 2015, Dimoutsos signed a three years' contract with Asteras Tripolis for an undisclosed fee, scoring his first goal for the club against Panionios, on 23 September 2015.

Platanias
On 4 September 2017, he signed a year contract with Platanias for an undisclosed fee.

Lamia
On 4 June 2018, he signed a contract with Lamia for an undisclosed fee.

Xanthi
On 6 October 2020, he signed a contract with Xanthi F.C. for an undisclosed fee.

International career
Dimoutsos made his debut for Greece in an away friendly win against Norway. This is his sole appearance for Greece to date.

References

External links
 
 

1988 births
Living people
Association football midfielders
Greek footballers
Albanian emigrants to Greece
Greek people of Albanian descent
Greece youth international footballers
Greece under-21 international footballers
Greece international footballers
Panathinaikos F.C. players
OFI Crete F.C. players
Panetolikos F.C. players
Fostiras F.C. players
Ilisiakos F.C. players
FK Mladá Boleslav players
Atromitos F.C. players
Asteras Tripolis F.C. players
Platanias F.C. players
PAS Lamia 1964 players
Super League Greece players
Czech First League players
Expatriate footballers in the Czech Republic
Sportspeople from Lushnjë